Mount Vernon Furnace, also known as Jacob's Creek Furnace and Alliance Iron Works, is a historic iron furnace located at Bullskin Township, Fayette County, Pennsylvania.  It was built in 1795 and rebuilt in 1801. It is a stone structure measuring 24 feet square and 30 feet high, with two arches. It was built as a blast furnace and went out of blast in 1825.

It was added to the National Register of Historic Places in 1991.

References

External links

Industrial buildings and structures on the National Register of Historic Places in Pennsylvania
Industrial buildings completed in 1801
Buildings and structures in Fayette County, Pennsylvania
Blast furnaces in the United States
National Register of Historic Places in Fayette County, Pennsylvania